Ouarzazate, nicknamed the door of the desert, is a city and capital of Ouarzazate Province in the region of Drâa-Tafilalet, south-central Morocco.

Berber-speakers make up the majority of the town's inhabitants, who were responsible for the creation of many of the prominent kasbahs (locally referred to as: iɣeṛman). Ouarzazate is a primary tourist destination in Morocco during the holidays, as well as a starting point for excursions into and across the Draa Valley and the desert. Aït Benhaddou (a fortified village) west of the city is a UNESCO World Heritage Site.

The Ouarzazate area is a noted film-making location, with Morocco's biggest studios inviting many international companies to work here. Films such as Lawrence of Arabia (1962), The Man Who Would Be King (1975), The Living Daylights (1987), The Last Temptation of Christ (1988), The Mummy (1999), Gladiator (2000), Kingdom of Heaven (2005), Kundun (1997), Legionnaire (1998), Hanna (2011), The Hills Have Eyes (2006), and Salmon Fishing in the Yemen (2011) were shot here, as was part of the TV series Game of Thrones.

The nearby Ouarzazate solar power station, co-funded by the Arab League, was connected to the Moroccan power grid in February 2016.

Etymology
Its name comes from a Berber phrase meaning "without noise" or "without confusion".

History
For a long time, Ouarzazate was a small crossing point for African traders on their way to northern Morocco and Europe. In the 16th century, Sheikh Abu al-'Abaas Ahmed bin Abdellah al-Wizkiti al-Warzazi, emir of the qasba of Ouarzazate and father of Lalla Masuda, helped establish Saadi control over the Sous-Dra'a region. 

During the French period, Ouarzazate expanded considerably as a garrison town, administrative centre and customs post. It is home to the Kasbah Taourirt, which was the kasbah of the former caïd and later owned by T'hami El Glaoui. The Krupp field gun which secured Glaoui power is displayed outside the kasbah today.

The area is also known for its Ouazguita carpets with geometric designs of red-orange on black background.

Climate
Ouarzazate has a hot desert climate (Köppen climate classification BWh). The city is hot and dry in summer, but can be very cold in winter, with icy winds coming from the High Atlas Mountains.

Film studios

Atlas Studios is one of the largest movie studios in the world,  in terms of land area. Movies were shot here including The Living Daylights, Asterix & Obelix: Mission Cleopatra, Lawrence of Arabia, The Man Who Would Be King, The Mummy, Kingdom of Heaven, Gladiator, and Babel. It was also the location of an episode of the television series The Amazing Race 10 and Game of Thrones (Season 3). Prison Break Season 5 was filmed here.

Another large studio in Ouarzazate is CLA Studios.

Sights nearby
The kasbah-town of Aït Benhaddou is nearby. Many excursions through the valley of the Draa River into the Sahara start from the city. These include trips to Zagora, an oasis town surrounded by palm tree plantations and a departure point for camel trains to Timbuktu, a journey that would take about 52 days. These days the border to Algeria is closed, stopping the Timbuktu route.

The city was part of the route of the 2006 and 2007 Dakar Rally.

Many sights can be visited within the city, but also, a wide list of interesting attractions can be found around Ouarzazate.

Sights around Ouarzazate 

 Tifoultoute Kasbah
 Fint Oasis
 Jbel Adad Petroglyphs
 Iguernan Nature Reserve
 Ksar Ait Benhaddou
 Ounila Valley
 Skoura Oasis
 Stork's Kasbah
 CLA Studios
 Atlas Film Studios
 The Abandoned "Hills Have Eyes" movie set
 Tizgui Waterfall
 Al Mansour Dahbi Dam
 Gazelle Animal Natural Reserve of Bouljir

Mapping
Detailed maps are hard to obtain in Morocco. The French IGN mapping at a 1:100,000 scale has been reproduced by the Moroccan Division de la carte. These maps are often out of date and obtained with special permission in Rabat. Soviet mapping on a 1:200,000 scale is available on the Internet, but these are generally outdated and show the names of places in Cyrillic letters.

A new series of maps are available, including the

Notable people 

Ayoub El Amloud, professional footballer

Gallery

See also
 Tizi n'Tichka – mountain pass that connects Ouarzazate and Marrakesh
 List of movies shot in Morocco
 Ouarzazate Airport
 Ouarzazate solar power station

Notes

References

External links

 Definitely Ouarzazate (facilities for filmmakers)
 Ouarzazate Film Commission
 Cinema Museum of Ouarzazate
 Movies shot in Ouarzazate at IMDb
 

Populated places in Ouarzazate Province
Ouarzazate